West Calder High School is a secondary school in West Calder, West Lothian, Scotland. The current school building was opened in 2018.

History
The school first opened in 1965 to take up to 750 pupils from the Calders Area of West Lothian, Scotland, which includes East Calder, Mid Calder, West Calder and Polbeth.  The enrollment of pupils in the school was around 900 pupils in 2011.

The current West Calder High School, the fourth to bear the name, was opened to staff and pupils in August 2018. Construction of the new school began in 2016. The school cost £32 million and was completed both on time and within budget. The 1,100 capacity school is West Lothian's biggest single investment in education and has been designed with the pupil experience at the core, as well as providing facilities accessible to the local community. The project was completed by Morrison Construction with developer Hub South East. The school was officially opened on 8 November 2018 by the UN Special Envoy for Global Education, the Rt Hon Gordon Brown, former UK Prime Minister.

Since its opening, the designers of the new West Calder High School building, NORR UK, were nominated for but did not win an award in the 'Pupil Experience' category at the 2018 Education Building Scotland Awards in November 2018. In 2019, the school won Project of the Year title at the Education Buildings Scotland Awards.

In March 2016 inspectors from Education Scotland visited the previous school building to carry out an inspection. This highlighted strengths and areas for improvement and identified that the school needed additional support to improve. A follow up visit was made by Education Scotland in June 2017 highlighting improvements made. In 2021, it was reported that the school had made significant gains in improving academic achievement. In May 2021, The Times reported that the school was placed in the top 20 of their school League Table and observed that it had become Scotland's most improved high school with 70 per cent of pupils attaining a gold standard of five highers or more.

Notable People
 Dougal Haston (1940–1977), mountaineer and pupil at West Calder High

References

External links 

Educational institutions established in 1965
Secondary schools in West Lothian
1965 establishments in Scotland